Lola Zunnunova (29 June 1984 in Termez, Uzbekistan) is an Uzbek journalist, TV presenter, art historian and film-critic.

Awards 
Lola Zunnunova was awarded by "M&TVA Awards" in 2007 for "The best TV presenter of the year". Moreover, she won the state organized competition "Eng ulug', eng aziz" in 2019.

Career 
During those years, she presented TV shows like "Munavvar tong", "Kinoafisha", "CinemaUZ", "Cinemania", "Kinomania", "Allo, ogoh bo'ling", "Ehtiyot bo'ling, Multfilm", "Yo'l-yo'lakay", "Qizlar davrasi", "Dugonalar", "Liboslar jilosi", "Yosh kitobxon", "Yangi kun", "Kinoqahramon" and "Bu kino...".

Starting from January, 2019, she worked as an editor-in-chief at Milliy TV and in August 2021, she became the general director of the channel. Today, Lola Zunnunova continues her leadership and creative work at "Shukrona Media Production", her privately owned company that produces media products. She also coaches women for oratory and personal growth.

Music Videos 

 Habibilarim (hymn of the women's personal growth course)

References

External links
 

1984 births
Living people
Uzbekistani journalists
Uzbekistani television presenters
Uzbekistani women television presenters
Film critics
Women film critics
Uzbekistani women journalists